Muschietti is a surname. Notable people with the surname include:

Andy Muschietti (born 1973), Argentine filmmaker 
Barbara Muschietti (born 1971), Argentine film producer and screenwriter